Annalisa is an Italian feminine given name. Notable people named Annalisa include:

 Annalisa Bona (born 1982), Italian tennis player
 Annalisa Bucci (born 1983), Italian kickboxer
 Annalisa Buffa (born 1973), Italian mathematician
 Annalisa Ceresa (born 1978), Italian alpine skier
 Annalisa Cochrane (born 1996), American actress
 Annalisa Coltorti (born 1963), Italian épée fencer
 Annalisa Crannell, American mathematician
 Annalisa Cucinotta (born 1986), Italian track cyclist
 Annalisa Drew (born 1993), American freestyle skier
 Annalisa Durante (1990–2004), 14-year-old girl shot by the Camorra
 Annalisa Ericson (1913–2011), Swedish actress
 Annalisa Insardà (born 1978), Italian actress
 Annalisa Marzano (born 1969), Italian-American archaeologist and academic
 Annalisa Minetti (born 1976), Italian blind singer and Paralympian
 Annalisa Nisiro (born 1973), Italian swimmer
 Annalisa Piras, Italian journalist and film director
  Annalisa Scarrone (born 1985), Italian singer-songwriter
 Annalisa Turci (born 1976), Italian softball player

See also
Annalise

Feminine given names
Italian feminine given names